Neuronal membrane glycoprotein M6-b is a protein that in humans is encoded by the GPM6B gene.

In melanocytic cells, GPM6B gene expression may be regulated by MITF.

References

Further reading